The World Is Bright is a Canadian documentary film, directed by Ying Wang and released in 2019.

The film centres on Qian Hui Deng and Xue Mei Li, a couple from China whose son Shi Ming committed suicide soon after emigrating to Canada, focusing both on their long campaign to understand the circumstances of his death and the mental health struggles often faced by immigrants due to their social, linguistic and cultural isolation from their new surroundings.

The film premiered at the 2019 Vancouver International Film Festival, where it won the award for best film in the Sea to Sky program. It was subsequently screened at the 2020 Hot Docs Canadian International Documentary Festival, where Wang won the Emerging Canadian Filmmaker award.

The film received two Canadian Screen Award nomination for Best Feature Length Documentary and Best Editing in a Documentary (Lawrence Le Lam) at the 9th Canadian Screen Awards in 2021.

References

External links
  
 
 Romina Mizrahi: https://www.mcgill.ca/psychiatry/romina-mizrahi/
 Interviews: https://www.theworldisbright.ca/impact/expert-interviews/ 

2019 films
2019 documentary films
Canadian documentary films
Films about Chinese Canadians
Films about immigration in Canada
2010s Canadian films